Brockdell (also known as Dill) is an unincorporated community in Bledsoe County, Tennessee, United States.  It lies west of the city of Pikeville, the county seat of Bledsoe County.  Its elevation is 1,742 feet (531 m).

References

Unincorporated communities in Bledsoe County, Tennessee
Unincorporated communities in Tennessee